Fernando Torres is a retired Spanish international footballer who represented his country 110 times and scored 38 goals between his international debut in 2003 and his final match in 2014. As of 2019, he is the third top scorer in the history of the national team, with only David Villa (59) and Raúl (44) having scored more goals for the country. Spain never lost a match in which he scored.

Having represented Spain at various youth levels, Torres made his senior debut on 6 September 2003 against Portugal and scored his first goal in a friendly match against Italy on 28 April 2004. During qualification for the 2006 FIFA World Cup, Torres scored seven goals in 11 appearances to help Spain qualify for the tournament. At the tournament proper he scored three goals, including a brace against Tunisia, as Spain were eliminated by France in the Round of 16. Two years later, at UEFA Euro 2008, Torres scored the winning goal in the 33rd minute of the final against Germany, ending Spain's run of 44 years without a trophy.

Spain's success at Euro 2008 saw the nation qualify as European champions for the 2009 FIFA Confederations Cup, the curtain-raiser for the 2010 FIFA World Cup to be held in South Africa. Torres scored three goals at the tournament, a hat-trick in Spain's 5–0 win over New Zealand on 14 June. His treble, which was scored within 11 minutes from kick-off, is the fastest hat-trick scored in the competition's history. He failed to score at the World Cup a year later but was part of the Spain squad which won the tournament, featuring as a late substitute in the final.

In 2012, Torres was selected for Spain's UEFA Euro 2012 squad and won the Golden Boot award for his three goals scored at the tournament. He netted a brace against the Republic of Ireland before scoring the third goal in a 4–0 win over Italy in the final. Torres' goal against the Italians was his second in the final of a European Championship. The following year, Torres scored five goals at the 2013 FIFA Confederations Cup. His tally, which included a four-goal haul against Tahiti, earned him another Golden Boot award. He was then included in Spain's squad for the 2014 FIFA World Cup in Brazil and scored against Australia in a 3–0 group-stage victory. It was a dead rubber match for Spain, however, as their elimination from the competition had already been confirmed.

Of Torres' 38 international goals scored, 10 were scored in friendlies, 8 at Confederations Cup Finals, 7 during World Cup Qualifiers, 5 at the European Championship Finals and 4 in both the European Championship Qualifiers and the World Cup Finals.

List of international goals
As of match played 23 June 2014. Spain score listed first, score column indicates score after each Torres goal.

See also
Spain national football team records and statistics
FIFA Confederations Cup records
List of Spain international footballers

References

Torres
Spain national football team records and statistics